William Jelly (1835 – October 1900) was an Ontario farmer and political figure. He represented Dufferin in the Legislative Assembly of Ontario from 1880 to 1883 as a Conservative member.

He was born near Elizabethtown (later Brockville) in Upper Canada in 1835, the son of John Jelly, an Irish immigrant. Jelly first settled in Amaranth Township then part of Wellington County and later moved to what is now Shelburne. He became a large property owner in the area, built a hotel there and is generally credited as being the founder of the town. Jelly served on the council for Melancthon Township and as the first reeve of Shelburne. He was elected to the provincial assembly after John Barr was unseated following an appeal.

External links 

History of Dufferin County, S Sawden (1952)

1835 births
1900 deaths
Progressive Conservative Party of Ontario MPPs
Canadian people of Irish descent